The Hermits of the Most Blessed Virgin Mary of Mount Carmel is a branch of the religious Carmelite Order of the Ancient Observance, who originated as hermit monks and have been mendicant friars since the 13th century. The male Carmelites of this branch of the order are not considered monastics as the cloistered Carmelite nuns are. However, Carmelite Hermits are new and separate communities of men and women living an enclosed life, inspired by the ancient Carmelite monastic life, under the authority of the Prior General of Carmelite Order (O.Carm.). Our Lady of Mount Carmel is the principal patroness of this type of Carmelite communities.

Hermit Communities under the Prior General (O.Carm.) authority

Male Communities 
 Hermits of the Blessed Virgin Mary of Mount Carmel – Christoval, Texas (U.S.A.)
 Hermits of Our Lady of Mount Carmel – Fairfield, Pennsylvania (U.S.A.)
 Carmelite Hermits of the Blessed Virgin Mary – Lake Elmo, Minnesota (U.S.A.)

Female Communities 
 Hermits of Our Lady of Mount Carmel – Chester, New Jersey (U.S.A.)
 Carmelite Hermits of Monteluro – Monteluro (Italy)
 Carmelite Hermits of Villefranche-de-Rouergue – Villefranche-de-Rouergue, Aveyron (France)

See also
 Carmelite Rule of St. Albert
 Book of the First Monks
 Constitutions of the Carmelite Order

References 

Carmelite Order
Carmelite spirituality